Catenospegazzinia elegans is a species of sac fungi. The holotype was found on dead inflorescence stalk of Xanthorrhoea preissii, in Western Australia.

References

External links 

 Catenospegazzinia elegans at global names

Fungi described in 1991
Ascomycota enigmatic taxa
Fungi of Australia
Biota of Western Australia